Werf or WERF may refer to:

Werf, a name for an artificial dwelling hill
WERF-LP, a low-power radio station (105.7 FM) licensed to serve Gainesville, Florida, United States
De Werf, a Belgian record label